Bojewyan is a settlement on the Penwith Peninsula in west Cornwall, England, United Kingdom. The village lies along the B3306 road which runs along the north coast and connects St Ives to St Just. It is located between the villages of Pendeen and Morvah. The settlement once had a Wesleyan Chapel which was reopened in May 1879 after alterations and repairs.

References

External links

Hamlets in Cornwall
Penwith
St Just in Penwith